|}

The Cork E.B.F. Novice Hurdle is a Listed National Hunt novice hurdle race in Ireland which is open to horses aged four years or older. 
It is run at Cork over a distance of 3 miles (4,828 metres), and it is scheduled to take place each year in late October or early November. The race has been sponsored since 2014 by Paddy Power.

The race was first run in 2000 and was awarded Grade 3 status in 2008. It was downgraded to Listed status in 2016.

Records
Most successful jockey (2 wins):
 Charlie Swan-  Panchovillas Gleam (2001), Satco Express (2002) 
 Davy Russell-  Laetitia (2005), Sword Of Destiny (2011) 
 John Cullen -  Premier Victory (2009), Mount Helicon (2010) 
 Paul Townend - Robin de Carlow (2018), Darrens Hope (2020) 
 Jack Kennedy -  Cracking Smart (2017), Cool Survivor (2022) 

Most successful trainer (3 wins): 
 Charles Byrnes–  Laetitia (2005), Liskennett (2007), Our Vinnie (2012) 
 Gordon Elliott -  Blood Crazed Tiger (2016), Cracking Smart (2017), Cool Survivor (2022)

Winners

See also
 Horse racing in Ireland
 List of Irish National Hunt races

References

Racing Post
 

National Hunt hurdle races
National Hunt races in Ireland
Cork Racecourse
2000 establishments in Ireland
Recurring sporting events established in 2000